Selenaspidina is a subtribe of armored scale insects.

Genera
Entaspidiotus
Mesoselenaspidus
Neoselenaspidus
Paraselenaspidus
Pseudoselenaspidus
Schizentaspidus
Selenaspidopsis
Selenaspidus
Selenediella
Selenomphalos

References

Aspidiotini